Christel Dewalle (born 3 July 1983) is a French female sky runner who claimed second place in the Vertical Kilometer at the 2014 Skyrunning World Championships.

World Cup wins

References

External links
 Christel Dewalle profile at Association of Road Racing Statisticians

1983 births
Living people
French female mountain runners
French sky runners
Trail runners
People from Annemasse
Sportspeople from Haute-Savoie
21st-century French women